The 1934 Grand National was the 93rd renewal of the Grand National horse race that took place at Aintree Racecourse near Liverpool, England, on 23 March 1934.

It was won by 8/1 shot Golden Miller in 9:20.4, breaking The Huntsman's 72-year-old record, and also becoming the first horse to win both the Grand National and the Cheltenham Gold Cup in the same year. The seven-year-old was ridden by jockey Gerry Wilson and trained by Basil Briscoe for owner Dorothy Paget.

Delaneige finished in second place, Thomond II was third and 1932 winner Forbra was fourth.

Thirty horses ran and all returned safely to the stables.

Finishing order

Non-finishers

References

https://web.archive.org/web/20131227085539/https://www.sportsbookguardian.com/horse-racing/grand-national/winners

 1934
Grand National
Grand National
20th century in Lancashire